Extra innings refers to the playing of additional innings in baseball in the event of a tie.

Extra innings may also refer to:

 Extra Innings (album), by The Outfield
 "Extra Innings" (The Twilight Zone), a television episode
 Extra Innings (video game), a game for the Super NES
 MLB Extra Innings, a Major League Baseball TV subscription package 
 Extraaa Innings T20, a cricket telecast during the Indian Premier League